Oman competed at the 1988 Summer Paralympics in Seoul, South Korea. 9 competitors from Oman won no medals and so did not place in the medal table.

See also 
 Oman at the Paralympics
 Oman at the 1988 Summer Olympics

References 

Oman at the Paralympics
1988 in Omani sport
Nations at the 1988 Summer Paralympics